Jean Franco Ferrari Chiabra (born 29 July 1975) is a retired Peruvian footballer who played as a midfielder. He last played for León de Huánuco in the Torneo Descentralizado.

Club career
Jean Ferrari began his senior career playing for Deportivo San Agustín in the 1995 Torneo Descentralizado season.

He then played for Universitario from 1996 to 1998, making 17 appearances in the 1997 season.

Ferrari then had a spell with La liga side CF Extremadura in the 1998–99 season.

Retirement
Since his retirement Ferrari was coach of Leon de Huanuco, TV announce and Athletic Director with Club Deportivo Universidad César Vallejo. In this role, he won the Torneo del Inca National Title in 2015.

On 13 August 2019, Ferrari was appointed sporting director of his former club, Universitario.

References

External links

1975 births
Living people
Sportspeople from Callao
Association football midfielders
Peruvian footballers
Peru international footballers
Peruvian Primera División players
Club Universitario de Deportes footballers
CF Extremadura footballers
Sporting Cristal footballers
Cienciano footballers
América de Cali footballers
Sport Boys footballers
Deportivo Municipal footballers
FBC Melgar footballers
León de Huánuco footballers
Categoría Primera A players
La Liga players
Peruvian expatriate footballers
Expatriate footballers in Spain
Expatriate footballers in Colombia
Peruvian football managers
León de Huánuco managers
Peruvian people of Italian descent